Kasu railway station (station code is KASU) is a railway station on the Panvel–Roha route of Central Railway in India. It is 117.28 km from Chhatrapati Shivaji Terminus via . It belongs to the Mumbai division of Central Railway.

The station is in Raigad district of Maharashtra.

References

Railway stations in Raigad district
Mumbai Suburban Railway stations
Panvel-Roha rail line